The Irish League in season 1994–95 comprised 16 teams, and Crusaders won the championship.

League standings

Results

References
Northern Ireland - List of final tables (RSSSF)

NIFL Premiership seasons
1
Northern